Vineyard Passage Burial Ground is a cemetery on Vineyard Passage in Richmond in the London Borough of Richmond upon Thames. Established in 1790 and consecrated in 1791, it was enlarged in 1823. The last burials were in 1874. Managed by Richmond upon Thames Council and maintained by volunteers from the Environment Trust for Richmond upon Thames, it is now a garden of rest.

Notable burials
 Thomas Cundy (senior) (1765–1825), English architect and his wife Mary (née Hubert). The monument to them is Grade II listed.
 Jacques Mallet du Pan (1749–1800), French historian and journalist. He took up the Royalist cause during the French Revolution.
 James Stephen Rigaud, English astronomer (b.1726)

Listing
The brick walls to the cemetery (forming the side of Vineyard Passage) and the 19th-century iron railings are Grade II listed.

Gallery

See also
 The Vineyard, Richmond

References

External links

 
 Vineyard Passage Burial Ground: official website
 Environment Trust for Richmond upon Thames: Vineyard Passage Burial Ground, April 2013
 Orr, Stephen. Vineyard Passage Burial Ground timeline,  Richmond Local History Society

1790 establishments in England
Burials at Vineyard Passage Burial Ground
Cemeteries in the London Borough of Richmond upon Thames
Grade II listed monuments and memorials
Richmond, London
Grade II listed buildings in the London Borough of Richmond upon Thames